The men's time trial class T1-2 road cycling event at the 2020 Summer Paralympics took place on 31 August 2021 at the Fuji Speedway, Japan. 9 riders all from different nations competed in this event.

The T1–2 classification is for cyclists who have an impairment which affects their balance. They compete with a three-wheeled cycle called a tricycle - three wheels providing more balance than a standard two-wheeled cycle.

Results
The event took place on 31 August 2021, at 15:23:

Factors
T1 – 86.480
T2 – 100.00

References

Men's road time trial T1–2